Communauté d'agglomération Grand Sud Caraïbe is a communauté d'agglomération, an intercommunal structure in the Guadeloupe overseas department and region of France. Created in 2011, its seat is in Basse-Terre. Its area is 343.5 km2. Its population was 77,186 in 2019.

Composition
The communauté d'agglomération consists of the following 11 communes:

Baillif
Basse-Terre
Bouillante
Capesterre-Belle-Eau
Gourbeyre
Saint-Claude
Terre-de-Bas
Terre-de-Haut
Trois-Rivières
Vieux-Fort
Vieux-Habitants

References

Grand Sud Caraibe
Grand Sud Caraibe